Recording the Angel was a project by the band Depeche Mode to record the concerts on the final two legs of their 2005–06 concert tour, Touring the Angel. The recording was done by London-based company Live Here Now.

Of the 46 shows that took place, 43 were recorded and made available on the band's website for direct download or on double CD via mail order. All the issued CDs featured the same artwork (cover and booklet), differing only in the band logo and the 'Recording The Angel' title, which was embossed with a different colour metal foil for each show, and in the setlist, which was printed on an extra white card, and the venue and show date printed on the front and back covers and on the discs themselves.

Recording the Angel releases

Shoreline Amphitheater, Mountain View, California, United States
Concert on 27 April 2006 / LHNCD01

Track listing
{|-
|width=250 valign=top|
Disc one
Intro
A Pain That I'm Used To
A Question of Time
Suffer Well
Precious
Walking in My Shoes
Stripped
Home
In Your Room
Nothing's Impossible
I Feel You
|width=250 valign=top|
Disc two
Behind the Wheel
World in My Eyes
Personal Jesus
Enjoy the Silence
Shake the Disease
Photographic
Never Let Me Down Again
|}

Coachella Valley Music and Arts Festival, Indio, California, United States
Concert on 29 April 2006.

Track listing
{|-
|width=250 valign=top|
Disc one
Intro
A Pain That I'm Used To
A Question of Time
Suffer Well
Precious
Walking in My Shoes
Stripped
Home
In Your Room
Nothing's Impossible
I Feel You
|width=250 valign=top|
Disc two
Behind the Wheel
World in My Eyes
Personal Jesus
Enjoy the Silence
Shake the Disease
Photographic
Never Let Me Down Again
|}

Theatre Under the Stars, Las Vegas, United States
Concert on 30 April 2006.

Track listing
{|-
|width=250 valign=top|
Disc one
Intro
A Pain That I'm Used To
A Question of Time
Suffer Well
Precious
Walking in My Shoes
Stripped
Home
Blue Dress
In Your Room
Nothing's Impossible
|width=250 valign=top|
Disc two
John the Revelator
I Feel You
Behind the Wheel
World in My Eyes
Personal Jesus
Enjoy the Silence
Shake the Disease
Photographic
Never Let Me Down Again
|}

Foro Sol, Mexico City, Mexico
Concert on 4 May 2006.

Track listing
{|-
|width=250 valign=top|
Disc one
Intro
A Pain That I'm Used To
A Question of Time
Suffer Well
Precious
Walking in My Shoes
Stripped
Home
Blue Dress
In Your Room
Nothing's Impossible
|width=250 valign=top|
Disc two
John the Revelator
I Feel You
Behind the Wheel
World in My Eyes
Personal Jesus
Enjoy the Silence
Shake the Disease
Photographic
Never Let Me Down Again
|}

Foro Sol, Mexico City, Mexico
Concert on 5 May 2006.

Track listing
{|-
|width=250 valign=top|
Disc one
Intro
A Pain That I'm Used To
A Question of Time
Suffer Well
Precious
Walking in My Shoes
Stripped
Home
Judas
In Your Room
The Sinner in Me
|width=250 valign=top|
Disc two
John the Revelator
I Feel You
Behind the Wheel
World in My Eyes
Personal Jesus
Enjoy the Silence
Leave in Silence
Just Can't Get Enough
Never Let Me Down Again
|}

Monterrey Arena, Mexico
Concert on 7 May 2006.

Track listing
{|-
|width=250 valign=top|
Disc one
Intro
A Pain That I'm Used To
A Question of Time
Suffer Well
Precious
Walking in My Shoes
Stripped
Home
It Doesn't Matter Two
In Your Room
|width=250 valign=top|
Disc two
Nothing's Impossible
I Feel You
Behind the Wheel
World in My Eyes
Personal Jesus
Enjoy the Silence
Shake the Disease
Photographic
Never Let Me Down Again
|}

Nikon at Jones Beach Theater, Wantagh, New York, United States
Concert on 13 May 2006.

Track listing
{|-
|width=250 valign=top|
Disc one
Intro
A Pain That I'm Used To
A Question of Time
Suffer Well
Precious
Walking in My Shoes
Stripped
Home
Judas
In Your Room
|width=250 valign=top|
Disc two
Nothing's Impossible
I Feel You
Behind the Wheel
World in My Eyes
Personal Jesus
Enjoy the Silence
Shake the Disease
Photographic
Never Let Me Down Again
|}

PNC Bank Arts Center, Holmdel Township, New Jersey, United States
Concert on 14 May 2006.

Track listing
{|-
|width=250 valign=top|
Disc one
Intro
A Pain That I'm Used To
A Question of Time
Suffer Well
Precious
Walking in My Shoes
Stripped
Home
It Doesn't Matter Two
In Your Room
|width=250 valign=top|
Disc two
The Sinner in Me
I Feel You
Behind the Wheel
World in My Eyes
Personal Jesus
Enjoy the Silence
Leave in Silence
Photographic
Just Can't Get Enough
Never Let Me Down Again
|}

Bell Centre, Montreal, Canada
Concert on 17 May 2006.

Track listing
{|-
|width=250 valign=top|
Disc one
Intro
A Pain That I'm Used To
A Question of Time
Suffer Well
Precious
Walking in My Shoes
Stripped
Home
Judas
In Your Room
|width=250 valign=top|
Disc two
Nothing's Impossible
I Feel You
John the Revelator
Behind the Wheel
World in My Eyes
Personal Jesus
Enjoy the Silence
Shake the Disease
Photographic
Never Let Me Down Again
|}

Air Canada Centre, Toronto, Canada
Concert on 18 May 2006.

Track listing
{|-
|width=250 valign=top|
Disc one
Intro
A Pain That I'm Used To
A Question of Time
Suffer Well
Precious
Walking in My Shoes
Stripped
Home
It Doesn't Matter Two
In Your Room
Nothing's Impossible
John the Revelator
|width=250 valign=top|
Disc two
I Feel You
Behind the Wheel
World in My Eyes
Personal Jesus
Enjoy the Silence
Shake the Disease
Photographic
Never Let Me Down Again
|}

Borgata Hotel Casino and Spa, Atlantic City, New Jersey, United States
Concert on 20 May 2006.

Track listing
{|-
|width=250 valign=top|
Disc one
Intro
A Pain That I'm Used To
A Question of Time
Suffer Well
Precious
Walking in My Shoes
Stripped
Home
Judas
In Your Room
Nothing's Impossible
|width=250 valign=top|
Disc two
John the Revelator
I Feel You
Behind the Wheel
World in My Eyes
Personal Jesus
Enjoy the Silence
Shake the Disease
Photographic
Never Let Me Down Again
|}

Nissan Pavilion, Washington, D.C., United States
Concert on 21 May 2006.

Track listing
{|-
|width=250 valign=top|
Disc one
Intro
A Pain That I'm Used To
A Question of Time
Suffer Well
Precious
Walking in My Shoes
Stripped
Home
It Doesn't Matter Two
In Your Room
Nothing's Impossible
|width=250 valign=top|
Disc two
John the Revelator
I Feel You
Behind the Wheel
World in My Eyes
Personal Jesus
Enjoy the Silence
Leave in Silence
Photographic
Never Let Me Down Again
|}

Rock im Park, Nuremberg, Germany
Concert on 2 June 2006.

Track listing
{|-
|width=250 valign=top|
Disc one
Intro
A Pain That I'm Used To
A Question of Time
Suffer Well
Precious
Walking in My Shoes
Stripped
Home
In Your Room
Nothing's Impossible
John the Revelator
|width=250 valign=top|
Disc two
I Feel You
Behind the Wheel
World in My Eyes
Personal Jesus
Enjoy the Silence
It Doesn't Matter Two
Photographic
Never Let Me Down Again
|}

Rock am Ring, Nürburgring, Germany
Concert on 4 June 2006.

Track listing
{|-
|width=250 valign=top|
Disc one
Intro
A Pain That I'm Used To
A Question of Time
Suffer Well
Precious
Walking in My Shoes
Stripped
Home
In Your Room
Nothing's Impossible
John the Revelator
|width=250 valign=top|
Disc two
I Feel You
Behind the Wheel
World in My Eyes
Personal Jesus
Enjoy the Silence
Judas
Photographic
Never Let Me Down Again
|}

Weserstadion, Bremen, Germany
Concert on 5 June 2006.

Track listing
{|-
|width=250 valign=top|
Disc one
Intro
A Pain That I'm Used To
A Question of Time
Suffer Well
Precious
Walking in My Shoes
Stripped
Home
It Doesn't Matter Two
In Your Room
Nothing's Impossible
John the Revelator
|width=250 valign=top|
Disc two
I Feel You
Behind the Wheel
World in My Eyes
Personal Jesus
Enjoy the Silence
Leave in Silence
Photographic
Never Let Me Down Again
|}

NRGi Park, Aarhus, Denmark
Concert on 7 June 2006.

Track listing
{|-
|width=250 valign=top|
Disc one
Intro
A Pain That I'm Used To
A Question of Time
Suffer Well
Precious
Walking in My Shoes
Stripped
Home
It Doesn't Matter Two
In Your Room
Nothing's Impossible
John the Revelator
|width=250 valign=top|
Disc two
I Feel You
Behind the Wheel
World in My Eyes
Personal Jesus
Enjoy the Silence
Leave in Silence
Photographic
Never Let Me Down Again
|}

Stadion Wojska Polskiego, Warsaw, Poland
Concert on 9 June 2006.

Track listing
{|-
|width=250 valign=top|
Disc one
Intro
A Pain That I'm Used To
A Question of Time
Suffer Well
Precious
Walking in My Shoes
Stripped
Home
It Doesn't Matter Two
In Your Room
Nothing's Impossible
John the Revelator
|width=250 valign=top|
Disc two
I Feel You
Behind the Wheel
World in My Eyes
Personal Jesus
Enjoy the Silence
Leave in Silence
Photographic
Never Let Me Down Again
|}

Inter Stadium, Bratislava, Slovakia
Concert on 11 June 2006.

Track listing
{|-
|width=250 valign=top|
Disc one
Intro
A Pain That I'm Used To
A Question of Time
Suffer Well
Precious
Walking in My Shoes
Stripped
Home
It Doesn't Matter Two
In Your Room
Nothing's Impossible
John the Revelator
|width=250 valign=top|
Disc two
I Feel You
Behind the Wheel
World in My Eyes
Personal Jesus
Enjoy the Silence
Leave in Silence
Photographic
Never Let Me Down Again
|}

Puskas Ferenc Stadium, Budapest, Hungary
Concert on 12 June 2006.

Track listing
{|-
|width=250 valign=top|
Disc one
Intro
A Pain That I'm Used To
A Question of Time
Suffer Well
Precious
Walking in My Shoes
Stripped
Home
Judas
In Your Room
Nothing's Impossible
John the Revelator
|width=250 valign=top|
Disc two
I Feel You
Behind the Wheel
World in My Eyes
Personal Jesus
Enjoy the Silence
Leave in Silence
Photographic
Never Let Me Down Again
|}

Bezigrad Stadium, Ljubljana, Slovenia
Concert on 14 June 2006.

Track listing
{|-
|width=250 valign=top|
Disc one
Intro
A Pain That I'm Used To
A Question of Time
Suffer Well
Precious
Walking in My Shoes
Stripped
Home
It Doesn't Matter Two
In Your Room
Nothing's Impossible
John the Revelator
|width=250 valign=top|
Disc two
I Feel You
Behind the Wheel
World in My Eyes
Personal Jesus
Enjoy the Silence
Shake the Disease
Photographic
Never Let Me Down Again
|}

Heineken Jammin' Festival, Imola, Italy
Concert on 16 June 2006.

Track listing
{|-
|width=250 valign=top|
Disc one
Intro
A Pain That I'm Used To
A Question of Time
Suffer Well
Precious
Walking in My Shoes
Stripped
Home
In Your Room
John the Revelator
|width=250 valign=top|
Disc two
I Feel You
Behind the Wheel
World in My Eyes
Personal Jesus
Enjoy the Silence
Shake the Disease
Photographic
Never Let Me Down Again
|}

Greenfield Festival, Interlaken, Switzerland
Concert on 17 June 2006.

Track listing
{|-
|width=250 valign=top|
Disc one
Intro
A Pain That I'm Used To
A Question of Time
Suffer Well
Precious
Walking in My Shoes
Stripped
Home
In Your Room
John the Revelator
|width=250 valign=top|
Disc two
I Feel You
Behind the Wheel
World in My Eyes
Personal Jesus
Enjoy the Silence
Shake the Disease
Photographic
Never Let Me Down Again
|}

Lokomotiv Stadium, Sofia, Bulgaria
Concert on 21 June 2006.

Track listing
{|-
|width=250 valign=top|
Disc one
Intro
A Pain That I'm Used To
A Question of Time
Suffer Well
Precious
Walking in My Shoes
Stripped
Home
It Doesn't Matter Two
In Your Room
Nothing's Impossible
John the Revelator
|width=250 valign=top|
Disc two
I Feel You
Behind the Wheel
World in My Eyes
Personal Jesus
Enjoy the Silence
Shake the Disease
Photographic
Never Let Me Down Again
|}

Stadionul Național, Bucharest, Romania
Concert on 23 June 2006.

Track listing
{|-
|width=250 valign=top|
Disc one
Intro
A Pain That I'm Used To
A Question of Time
Suffer Well
Precious
Walking in My Shoes
Stripped
Home
It Doesn't Matter Two
In Your Room
Nothing's Impossible
John the Revelator
|width=250 valign=top|
Disc two
I Feel You
Behind the Wheel
World in My Eyes
Personal Jesus
Enjoy the Silence
Leave in Silence
Photographic
Never Let Me Down Again
|}

O2 Wireless Festival, London, England
Concert on 25 June 2006.

Track listing
{|-
|width=250 valign=top|
Disc one
Intro
A Pain That I'm Used To
A Question of Time
Suffer Well
Precious
Walking in My Shoes
Stripped
Home
In Your Room
John the Revelator
|width=250 valign=top|
Disc two
I Feel You
Behind the Wheel
World in My Eyes
Personal Jesus
Enjoy the Silence
Shake the Disease
Photographic
Never Let Me Down Again
|}

The Point, Dublin, Ireland
Concert on 26 June 2006.

Track listing
{|-
|width=250 valign=top|
Disc one
Intro
A Pain That I'm Used To
A Question of Time
Suffer Well
Precious
Walking in My Shoes
Stripped
Home
It Doesn't Matter Two
In Your Room
Nothing's Impossible
John the Revelator
|width=250 valign=top|
Disc two
I Feel You
Behind the Wheel
World in My Eyes
Personal Jesus
Enjoy the Silence
Leave in Silence
Photographic
Never Let Me Down Again
|}

Waldbühne, Berlin, Germany
Concert on 28 June 2006.

Track listing
{|-
|width=250 valign=top|
Disc one
Intro
A Pain That I'm Used To
A Question of Time
Suffer Well
Precious
Walking in My Shoes
Stripped
Home
It Doesn't Matter Two
In Your Room
Nothing's Impossible
John the Revelator
|width=250 valign=top|
Disc two
I Feel You
Behind the Wheel
World in My Eyes
Personal Jesus
Enjoy the Silence
Leave in Silence
Photographic
Never Let Me Down Again
|}

City Square, Arras, France
Concert on 29 June 2006.

Track listing
{|-
|width=250 valign=top|
Disc one
Intro
A Pain That I'm Used To
A Question of Time
Suffer Well
Precious
Walking in My Shoes
Stripped
Home
It Doesn't Matter Two
In Your Room
Nothing's Impossible
John the Revelator
|width=250 valign=top|
Disc two
I Feel You
Behind the Wheel
World in My Eyes
Personal Jesus
Enjoy the Silence
Shake the Disease
Photographic
Never Let Me Down Again
|}

Eurockeennes Festival, Belfort, France
Concert on 1 July 2006.

Track listing
{|-
|width=250 valign=top|
Disc one
Intro
A Pain That I'm Used To
A Question of Time
Suffer Well
Precious
Walking in My Shoes
Stripped
Home
In Your Room
John the Revelator
|width=250 valign=top|
Disc two
I Feel You
Behind the Wheel
World in My Eyes
Personal Jesus
Enjoy the Silence
Shake the Disease
Photographic
Never Let Me Down Again
|}

Rock Werchter Festival, Werchter, Belgium
Concert on 2 July 2006.

Track listing
{|-
|width=250 valign=top|
Disc one
Intro
A Pain That I'm Used To
A Question of Time
Suffer Well
Precious
Walking in My Shoes
Stripped
Home
In Your Room
John the Revelator
|width=250 valign=top|
Disc two
I Feel You
Behind the Wheel
World in My Eyes
Personal Jesus
Enjoy the Silence
Leave in Silence
Photographic
Never Let Me Down Again
|}

Olympic Stadium, Stockholm, Sweden
Concert on 7 July 2006.

Track listing
{|-
|width=250 valign=top|
Disc one
Intro
A Pain That I'm Used To
A Question of Time
Suffer Well
Precious
Walking in My Shoes
Stripped
Home
It Doesn't Matter Two
In Your Room
Nothing's Impossible
John the Revelator
|width=250 valign=top|
Disc two
I Feel You
Behind the Wheel
World in My Eyes
Personal Jesus
Enjoy the Silence
Shake the Disease
Photographic
Never Let Me Down Again
|}

Moon and Stars Festival, Locarno, Switzerland
Concert on 10 July 2006.

Track listing
{|-
|width=250 valign=top|
Disc one
Intro
A Pain That I'm Used To
A Question of Time
Suffer Well
Precious
Walking in My Shoes
Stripped
Home
It Doesn't Matter Two
In Your Room
Nothing's Impossible
John the Revelator
|width=250 valign=top|
Disc two
I Feel You
Behind the Wheel
World in My Eyes
Personal Jesus
Enjoy the Silence
Leave in Silence
Photographic
Never Let Me Down Again
|}

Waldbühne, Berlin, Germany
Concert on 12 July 2006.

Track listing
{|-
|width=250 valign=top|
Disc one
Intro
A Pain That I'm Used To
A Question of Time
Suffer Well
Precious
Walking in My Shoes
Stripped
Home
Judas
In Your Room
John the Revelator
The Sinner in Me
|width=250 valign=top|
Disc two
I Feel You
Behind the Wheel
World in My Eyes
Personal Jesus
Enjoy the Silence
Shake the Disease
Just Can't Enough
Never Let Me Down Again
|}

Waldbühne, Berlin, Germany
Concert on 13 July 2006.

Track listing
{|-
|width=250 valign=top|
Disc one
Intro
A Pain That I'm Used To
A Question of Time
Suffer Well
Precious
Walking in My Shoes
Stripped
Home
 It Doesn't Matter Two
In Your Room
Nothing's Impossible
John the Revelator
|width=250 valign=top|
Disc two
I Feel You
Behind the Wheel
World in My Eyes
Personal Jesus
Enjoy the Silence
Somebody
Photographic
Never Let Me Down Again
|}

Festwiese, Leipzig, Germany
Concert on 15 July 2006.

Track listing
{|-
|width=250 valign=top|
Disc one
Intro
A Pain That I'm Used To
A Question of Time
Suffer Well
Precious
Walking in My Shoes
Stripped
Home
 It Doesn't Matter Two
In Your Room
Nothing's Impossible
John the Revelator
|width=250 valign=top|
Disc two
I Feel You
Behind the Wheel
World in My Eyes
Personal Jesus
Enjoy the Silence
Somebody
Photographic
Never Let Me Down Again
|}

Stadio Olimpico, Rome, Italy
Concert on 17 July 2006.

Track listing

Paleo Festival, Nyon, Switzerland
Concert on 19 July 2006.

Track listing

Arena, Nîmes, France
Concert on 20 July 2006.

Track listing

Anoeta Stadium, San Sebastián, Spain
Concert on 22 July 2006. Martin Gore's 45th birthday.

Track listing

Parque Antonio Soria, Torrevieja, Spain
Concert on 25 July 2006.

Track listing

Plaza de Toros, Granada, Spain
Concert on 26 July 2006.

Track listing

Kurucesme Arena, Istanbul, Turkey
Concert on 30 July 2006.

Track listing

Terra Vibe Park, Athens, Greece
Concert on 1 August 2006.

Track listing

References

Live album series
Depeche Mode live albums
2006 live albums
2000s live albums